V-set and immunoglobulin domain containing 2 is a protein in humans that is encoded by the VSIG2 gene.

References

Further reading 

Genes on human chromosome 11